Samuel James Johnson is an Australian music producer and sound balance engineer who has worked with bands of many genres.

He works predominantly out of Three Phase studios in Melbourne, Australia.

Discography

References

External links
 MySpace profile

Australian musicians
Living people
Year of birth missing (living people)